Shapeshifter is the second studio album by American pop-punk band Knuckle Puck. It was released on October 13, 2017 through Rise Records. In December, they co-headlined The Holiday Extravaganza festival with Real Friends. In October and November 2018, the group supported Good Charlotte on their headlining US tour.

Track listing

Personnel
Joe Taylor - lead vocals
Nick Casasanto - rhythm guitar, co-lead vocals
Kevin Maida - lead guitar
Ryan Rumchaks - bass, backing vocals
John Siorek - drums

Charts

References

Knuckle Puck albums
Rise Records albums
2017 albums